Cycas shanyaensis is a species of cycad endemic to Hainan, China.

Range
Cycas shanyaensis is located in Yaxian, Hainan Island, China. Plants are found in the vicinity of Baolongshan (Baolongdong?) near Sanya City.

References

shanyaensis
Flora of Hainan